Joseph Lawrence Mignogna Jr. (born April 20, 1976) is an American actor, musician, singer-songwriter, record producer, and game show host. He got his start as a child star in the early 1980s and is best known for his role as Joey Russo in Blossom and Joe Longo in Melissa & Joey. Lawrence also starred in Gimme a Break! (1983–1987), and the series Brotherly Love with his real-life brothers Matthew and Andrew, and for his film roles in Summer Rental (1985) and Oliver & Company (1988).

Early life
Lawrence was born in Abington, Pennsylvania and raised in Philadelphia, the son of Donna Lynn (née Shaw), a personnel manager and former elementary school teacher and Joseph Lawrence Mignogna Sr., an insurance broker. He is of Italian, English, and Scottish descent. His family's surname was changed to "Lawrence" during his childhood. He has two younger brothers, Matt and Andy, who are also actors.

He graduated from Abington Friends School in Jenkintown, Pennsylvania in 1994 and later attended the University of Southern California.

Career

Acting
Lawrence's first acting role was in a Cracker Jack commercial. At the age of five, he appeared on The Tonight Show Starring Johnny Carson, where he performed the song "Give My Regards to Broadway".

After appearing in guest spots on Diff'rent Strokes and Silver Spoons, Lawrence won the role of Joey Donovan on the hit NBC sitcom Gimme a Break! in 1983. He continued in that role until the series ended in 1987. 1985 marked Lawrence's theatrical debut with the release of Summer Rental. Lawrence provided the voice of Oliver, the protagonist in the 1988 Disney film Oliver & Company at the age of 12. From 1991 to 1995, at the age of 15, Lawrence co-starred in the hit TV series Blossom on NBC, playing Joey Russo.

Lawrence has also starred in the series Brotherly Love (which featured his real-life brothers, Matthew and Andrew Lawrence) and Run of the House and has guest starred on such programs as  American Dreams and CSI: NY. One of Lawrence's film credits is Urban Legends: Final Cut (2000).

In 2006, Lawrence appeared on ABC's Dancing with the Stars. Paired with professional dancer Edyta Śliwińska, he placed third in the competition.

In May 2007, he starred in the Broadway hit Chicago as Billy Flynn. He next hosted a dance competition show on The Learning Channel, Master of Dance, which premiered June 9, 2008.

In 2009, Lawrence starred in the television film My Fake Fiancé with Melissa Joan Hart, which premiered on ABC Family with 3.6  million viewers, becoming the most-watched television film the rating season, sweeping top rank in its time period in key demos. In August 2010, Lawrence returned to television in the ABC Family sitcom Melissa & Joey, again opposite Hart. Hart plays a woman who hires Lawrence as a nanny to help care for her incarcerated sister's kids. Lawrence's character is a former figure in the financial industry whose company came under investigation for wrongdoing and caused his professional life to be put on hold. Lawrence's brothers have guest-starred on the show. Matthew Lawrence played Tony Longo in season 1 episode 25 and Andrew Lawrence appeared in season 1 episode 26 as Ryder Scanlon's teacher, Evan McKay. The series was renewed for its fourth season and ended in 2015.

In 2012, he was contracted to be a Chippendales dancer for a special engagement in June at the Rio All-Suite Hotel and Casino in Las Vegas. On March 19, 2013, Lawrence began appearing in the ABC reality show Splash, co-hosting alongside Charissa Thompson.

In 2022, Lawrence competed in season eight of The Masked Singer as "Walrus". He was eliminated on "90s Night" alongside Le'Veon Bell as "Milkshake".

Music career
Lawrence has said that music was always his passion, and at the height of his success began a recording career. Lawrence was 16 when his debut album Joey Lawrence was released in February 1993. Produced by Steve Barri, Tony Peluso, Terry Lupton, and Ian Prince. Lawrence co-wrote some material, including the international hit single "Nothin' My Love Can't Fix" (#6 Billboard Hot 100 Airplay, No. 10 Billboard Top 40 Mainstream, No. 19  Billboard Hot 100, No. 13 United Kingdom, No. 68 Australia). The song was used as the end-title theme from the film Cop and a Half; its music video received heavy airplay on MTV and MuchMusic, and Lawrence was invited to perform live on MTV's Spring Break, The Arsenio Hall Show, and the UK's Top of the Pops in 1993.

In June 2011, he released a single, "Rolled", which was available as a free download for one week on ABC Family's website. In July, Joey released a second single, "Give It To Ya (Acoustic)" via Pledge Music. In 2017 Joey started a band with Matt and Andy called Still 3. They released their debut single "Lose Myself".

Personal life
Lawrence married Michelle Vella in 2002; the couple divorced in 2005.

He met his second wife, Chandie Yawn-Nelson, earlier while on vacation in Disney World when the two were teenagers; they wed there in July 2005. They have two children. Reports had surfaced in March 2018 that Lawrence and Yawn-Nelson had filed for bankruptcy in July 2017. On April 6, 2018, the Chapter 7 bankruptcy case was reportedly settled.  Lawrence filed for divorce in July 2020. 

In August 2021, Lawrence announced his engagement to actress Samantha Cope whom he met on the set of a Lifetime movie directed by his brother Andrew and co-starring his daughter Charleston.  On May 1, 2022, Lawrence and Cope were married in California. On September 9, 2022, they announced that they are expecting their first child together. On January 16, 2023, they welcomed daughter Dylan Rose.

Filmography

Film

Television

Dancing with the Stars

Theater
 Chicago (2007) as Billy Flynn (replacement)

Discography

Studio albums

Extended plays

Singles

References

External links
 
 
 
 

1976 births
Living people
20th-century American male actors
20th-century American male singers
20th-century American singers
21st-century American male actors
21st-century American male singers
21st-century American singers
American child singers
American dance musicians
American game show hosts
American male child actors
American male dancers
American male erotic dancers
American male film actors
American male pop singers
American male singer-songwriters
American male television actors
American male voice actors
American people of English descent
American people of Italian descent
American people of Scottish descent
Curb Records artists
Geffen Records artists
Male actors from Philadelphia
MCA Records artists
Musicians from Philadelphia
Participants in American reality television series
People from Abington Township, Montgomery County, Pennsylvania
People from Jenkintown, Pennsylvania
People from Montgomery County, Pennsylvania
Record producers from Pennsylvania
Singer-songwriters from Pennsylvania
Television producers from Pennsylvania
University of Southern California alumni